Chin Para (Japanese: チン☆パラ) was a pop a cappella group featuring 6 members.  The group made its major debut in 2002 and broke up on April 7, 2004. Chin*Para entered the final round of the Japanese a cappella TV competition "Hamonepu" on FUJI TV.

Japanese pop music groups
Musical groups from Saitama Prefecture